, or Yunoyama Hot Springs, is a hot springs resort located near Mount Gozaisho in the town of Komono (Mie District), Mie Prefecture, Japan. The area is within the borders of the Suzuka Quasi-National Park.

Yunoyama Onsen has been a tourist destination since the Nara period, and remains popular to travellers especially from Nagoya, Osaka and Kyoto due to its ease of access via the Kintetsu Yunoyama Line.

External links
 Yunoyama Onsen

Landforms of Mie Prefecture
Hot springs of Mie Prefecture
Tourist attractions in Mie Prefecture
Komono